Brunico Communications is a Canadian magazine publishing company. The company specializes primarily in online trade magazines serving media industries, including the magazines Playback, Realscreen, Kidscreen and Strategy.

The company has also owned and operated the Banff World Media Festival, one of the world's largest film and television industry conferences, since 2016.

It also oversees the Kidscreen Awards, a ceremony which focuses on recognizing outstanding achievement in youth entertainment, including categories in Preschool, Children, and Young Adult programming in television and film.

History
The company was established by James Shenkman in 1986. Soon after unsuccessfully applying for a Canadian Radio-television and Telecommunications Commission license for a radio station in Mississauga, he identified a gap in Canadian coverage of media industries, and formed the company to launch Playback, a magazine covering Canadian film and television production. In 1989, the company launched Strategy, an advertising and business magazine, and in 1996, it launched KidScreen, covering news in children's film and television.

Other later titles included Boards, devoted to advertising commercial production; Media in Canada, covering general media industry news; and RealScreen, devoted to documentary and non-fiction film and television.

In 2010, the company stopped print publication of Playback, transitioning it to an online-only magazine, and shut down Boards.

In 2016, Brunico acquired Marketing, a title which had formerly competed with Strategy, from Rogers Media. Marketing was merged with Strategy.

Kidscreen and The Kidscreen Awards
Kidscreen is an international magazine devoted to engaging the global children's entertainment industry. They publish a quarterly printed magazine and an industry news site, and also host the annual Kidscreen Summit, a conference gathering industry and journalism professionals.

The Kidscreen Awards take place during the Kidscreen Summit, an event dedicated to honoring achievements in television and film for children and young adults, recognizing outstanding programming in a range of categories from across the entertainment industry.

Realscreen and The Realscreen Awards
Realscreen is "the only international magazine devoted exclusively to the non-fiction film and television industries", publishes a quarterly printed magazine, hosts a website which includes breaking news and industry information, and runs the annual Realscreen Summit.

The Realscreen Awards take place during the Realscreen Summit, presenting awards to unscripted and non-fiction film media in a range of categories.

References

External links

Magazine publishing companies of Canada
Publishing companies established in 1986
Companies based in Toronto
1986 establishments in Ontario